Joseph Marchand (17 August 1803 – 30 November 1835) was a French missionary in Vietnam and a member of the Paris Foreign Missions Society. He is now a Catholic saint, celebrated on 30 November.

Personal life 

Marchand was born in Passavant, in the Doubs department of France. At the age of 25 he joined the Paris Foreign Mission, whose primary goal was (and still is) to evangelize countries in Asia.

Vietnam 
In 1833, he was invited to join the Lê Văn Khôi revolt led by Lê Văn Khôi, son of the late governor of southern Vietnam Lê Văn Duyệt. He vowed to overthrow Emperor Minh Mạng and replace him with My Duong, the son of Minh Mạng's late elder brother Nguyễn Phúc Cảnh, who were both Catholics. Khoi appealed to other Catholics to join in overthrowing Minh Mạng and installing a Catholic emperor. They quickly seized the Citadel of Saigon in an uprising lasting two years. 

In 1835, he was arrested and later executed in Huế, subsequently becoming a Catholic martyr after having his flesh pulled from his bones by tongs, known as death by a thousand cuts.

Marchand was canonized by Pope John Paul II in 1988. His feast day is 30 November and his joint feast day with the Vietnamese Martyrs is 24 November.

See also
Vietnamese Martyrs

References

External links
 .
 .
 .

1803 births
1835 deaths
French Roman Catholic saints
Vietnamese Roman Catholic saints
Paris Foreign Missions Society missionaries
19th-century executions by Vietnam
1835 in Vietnam
19th-century Roman Catholic martyrs
19th-century Christian saints
French people executed abroad
People from Doubs
People executed by flaying
Executed people from Franche-Comté
Roman Catholic missionaries in Vietnam
French expatriates in Vietnam